Öznur Kızıl (born in 1991) is a Turkish female wushu practitioner competing in the Sanshou 48 kg division.

Since 2004, she is a member of the Akca Sport Club in Sultanbeyli, Istanbul, where she is coached by Niyazi Akca. She is a student at the Kocaeli Academy of Sports and Physical Education.

Achievements
  (48 kg) 1st World Junior Wushu Championships -  19–26 August 2006, Kuala Lumpur, Malaysia
  (48 kg) 10th World Wushu Championships -  25–29 October 2009, Toronto, Canada
  (48 kg) 13th European Wushu Championships -  6–13 March 2010, Antalya, Turkey
  (48 kg) 5th Sanda World Cup -  16–18 December 2010, Chongqing, China

References

1991 births
Living people
Turkish sanshou practitioners
Turkish female martial artists